The Greenbelt Police Department (GPD) is the primary law enforcement agency servicing  a population of 21,972 within  of the city of Greenbelt.

Organization
The GPD is a nationally accredited law enforcement agency. The current chief of police is Richard Bowers. The GPD has an authorized strength of over 70 officers and is divided into three sections:
Patrol Division- has sworn 31 officers and is divided within the following:
Communications
Bike Unit
Honor Guard
Traffic
Crash Reconstruction
Special Operations- was created in July 1987 with a (then) Tactical Unit and has grown to include the following:
Emergency Response Unit (SWAT)
K-9
Criminal Investigation
Evidence Unit (fingerprinting)
Narcotics Task Force
School Resource (SRO)
Administrative Services
Media Relations

See also 

 List of law enforcement agencies in Maryland
 City of Greenbelt, Maryland
 Prince George's County

References

External links
Greenbelt Police Department homepage
Greenbelt Fraternal Order of Police Lodge #32
City of Greenbelt official website

Municipal police departments of Maryland
Greenbelt, Maryland